Nuno Filipe Gomes Laurentino (born 3 August 1975) is a Portuguese former competition swimmer who represented Portugal at the 1996 Summer Olympics in Atlanta and the 2000 Summer Olympics in Sydney.

Laurentino was born in Lisbon. He attended the University of Florida in Gainesville, Florida, where he swam for the Florida Gators swimming and diving team in National Collegiate Athletic Association (NCAA) competition in 1997.
 
Considered by many the most eclectic Portuguese swimmer of all time, at one point he held fifty percent of all Portuguese national swimming records.  He was the first Portuguese swimmer to break the fifty-second mark in the 100-meter freestyle short course and the first Iberian swimmer to break the fifty-second mark in the 100-meter freestyle long course.  He retired from competitive swimming in 2007.

See also

 List of University of Florida alumni
 List of University of Florida Olympians

External links
 sports-reference

1975 births
Living people
Portuguese male backstroke swimmers
Florida Gators men's swimmers
Portuguese male freestyle swimmers
Portuguese male medley swimmers
Olympic swimmers of Portugal
Swimmers from Lisbon
Swimmers at the 1996 Summer Olympics
Swimmers at the 2000 Summer Olympics
S.L. Benfica (swimming)